Stefania Skwarczyńska de domo   (born November 17, 1902 in Kamionka Strumiłowa , died April 28, 1988 in Łódź) was a Polish theorist and historian of literature, theatrologist, full professor, doctor honoris causa of the University of Łódź, and World War II resistance fighter.

In April 1940, as the wife of a Polish officer imprisoned in Starobelsk officer's camp, she, her children, and her mother-in-law were exiled to Kazakhstan, from where she was released back to Lwów by the efforts of scientists and continued her work at Lwów University. During the German occupation she was employed at the Lviv Institute for Typhus and Virus Research as a manager of the department of "lice feeders" (1941-1944).  During this time she took part in the underground education in Poland during World War II. In 1945 she became a member of the Union of Armed Struggle, known under the noms de guerre: "Maria" and "Jarema" and took part in actions for liberating the Jews.

In 1988 a documentary about her was released, Stefania Skwarczyńska – szkic do portretu uczonej.

Books
Ewolucja obrazów u Słowackiego. Lwów 1925
Szkice z zakresu teorii literatury. Lwów 1932
Teoria listu. Lwów 1937 (pierwsze wznowienie: Białystok 2005)
Z teorii literatury cztery rozprawy. Łódź 1947
Systematyka głównych kierunków w badaniach literackich. Łódź 1948, vol. I
Studia i szkice literackie. Warszawa 1953
Wstęp do nauki o literaturze. Warszawa 1954-1965, vols. I-III
Mickiewiczowskie „powinowactwa z wyboru”. Warszawa 1957
Leona Schillera trzy inscenizacje „Nie-Boskiej komedii” Zygmunta Krasińskiego. Warszawa 1959
Teoria badań literackich za granicą. Warszawa 1965, vols. I i II
W kręgu wielkich romantyków polskich. Warszawa 1966
Wokół teatru i literatury. Warszawa 1970
Pomiędzy historią a teorią literatury. Warszawa 1975
Kierunki w badaniach literackich. Warszawa 1984
W orbicie literatury – teatru – kultury naukowej. Warszawa 1985

Awards and decorations
1954: Gold Cross of Merit
1954: Medal of the 10th Anniversary of People's Poland
1959: Medal of Peace , World Peace Council  
1965: Individual Award of 1st degree from the Ministry of Education of the Polish People's Republic
1966: Officer's Cross of the Order of Polonia Restituta
1969: 
1978: Prize of the Scientific Society of the John Paul II Catholic University of Lublin, "for the lifetime scientific achievements in the spirit of Christian humanism"

References
 

1902 births
1988 deaths
Academic staff of the University of Łódź
Recipients of the Gold Cross of Merit (Poland)
Polish literary historians
Home Army members